Ken Yasuda may refer to:
Ken Yasuda (bodybuilder) (born 1971), Japanese professional bodybuilder
Ken Yasuda (actor) (born 1973), Japanese actor
Kenneth Yasuda (1914–2002), Japanese-American scholar and translator